Guillaume Fouace (22 May 1837, Réville - 7 January 1895, Paris) was a French painter. He produced over 700 paintings in a realist style, mainly portraits, still lifes and landscapes - the Musée d'Orsay has some of them, whilst 40 are displayed in a 'Salle de Fouace' at the Musée Thomas-Henry in Cherbourg-en-Cotentin.

Life 
Born to farmers in Réville, a hamlet of Jonville, he took over the family farm aged 24 after his father's death. He had produced drawings since he was a child and his talent was recognised by the museum curator in Cherbourg (Cherbourg-en-Cotentin since 2016), who gained Fouace two municipal bursaries from Cherbourg to study art in Paris (as had his predecessor from Cotentin, Jean-François Millet). There he studied under Adolphe Yvon before setting up a studio as a portrait painter. He then fought in the Franco-Prussian War. In 1870, three years after arriving in Paris, he exhibited at the Paris Salon. In 1873 he exhibited his first still lifes.

After the war he moved permanently to Paris with his wife, the daughter of a pharmacist in Cherbourg who he had married in 1874. However, he did not forget the Cotentin - in 1878 he painted 19 canvases of biblical scenes such as the Annunciation, Flight from Egypt and the journey of the Magi for the vaults of the church at Montfarville, while for its choir he painted a copy of Leonardo da Vinci's Last Supper.

He died in 1895 of a pulmonary disease after receiving the medal of a Chevalier of the Légion d'honneur. His tomb in Réville features a recumbent white marble statue of his daughter Beatrix (1875–1888).

Gallery

Bibliography

  Éric Lefèvre. Peintres de Normandie, Orep Éditions, 2007.
  Maurice Lecoeur "Autour de Guillaume Fouace", Editions Isoète, 2010

External links
  Colette Delaite, Guillaume Fouace : Une seule ombre aux tableaux on the city site of Cherbourg

1837 births
1895 deaths
19th-century French painters
French male painters
People from Manche
Chevaliers of the Légion d'honneur
19th-century French male artists